Die Bambus-Bären-Bande (Bambou et Compagnie in French or Bamboo Bears in English) is a German-French 52 part animated television series, broadcast from 25 March to 30 November 1996.

Characters
 Bamboo-Lee is a red panda and the boss of the pack.
 Dah-Lee is a mouse and smallest of the four.
 Sio-Lee is a giant panda and the only true bear of the cast. He is gluttonous.
 Ai-Ai is a pink dragon and the biggest of the cast. She can be called by anyone whirling her magic bamboo stick and often acts as the group's vehicle.

1990s French animated television series
German animated television series
1996 French television series debuts
1996 French television series endings
1996 German television series debuts
1996 German television series endings
Australian Broadcasting Corporation original programming